Eshgaft Gah (also Romanized as Eshkaft Gāh; also known as Eshkaft Gāh and Eshkaft Gah) is a village in Howmeh-ye Sharqi Rural District, in the Central District of Izeh County, Khuzestan Province, Iran. At the 2006 census, its population was 262, in 47 families.

References 

Populated places in Izeh County